The following television stations operate on virtual channel 4 in Canada:

 CBAT-DT in Fredericton, New Brunswick
 CBOT-DT in Ottawa, Ontario
 CFCM-DT in Quebec City, Quebec
 CFCN-DT in Calgary, Alberta
 CFRS-DT in Saguenay, Quebec
 CFSK-DT in Saskatoon, Saskatchewan
 CFTF-DT-4 in Forestville, Quebec
 CHAU-DT-7 in Rivière-au-Renard, Quebec
 CHFD-DT in Thunder Bay, Ontario
 CIII-DT-4 in Owen Sound, Ontario
 CIMT-DT-1 in Edmundston, New Brunswick
 CITL-DT in Lloydminster, Alberta/Saskatchewan
 CKRN-DT in Rouyn-Noranda, Quebec

04 virtual TV stations in Canada